Viswa Mohini is a 1940 Telugu-language romantic thriller film in the backdrop of Indian motion picture world, directed by Y. V. Rao. The ensemble cast starring V. Nagayya was written by Balijepalli Lakshmikanta Kavi, and was screened at the Venice Film Festival. The production design was handled by T. V. S. Sarma, and cinematography was handled by Pandurang Naik.

It is the first Indian film to be made about the movie world. The film released in 1940, and turned out to be a mediocre success.

Plot 
Mohan Rao, who works for a Law firm in Madras, cheats his Manager Padmanabham, and becomes the owner of the company through illegal means. Mohan Rao is the son of Padmanabham's business rival Purushothama Rao. He plans his son Mohan Rao's marriage with Hemalatha, the daughter of a wealthy widow Visalakshi who happens to be Puroshothama Rao's neighbour. But Mohan Rao is not interested in this alliance.

Pasupathi, a renowned filmmaker and friend of Mohan Rao, lures him to popular actress Viswamohini on the sets of a film shooting. Viswamohini is the daughter of Padmanabham who is cheated by Mohan Rao. Mohan Rao develops a secret affair with Viswamohini, and expresses his wish to marry her.  Padmanabham, is unaware of the fact that Mohan Rao is the son of his arch rival Purushotham.

Meanwhile, Pasupathi lures the wealthy Visalakshi into film production and distribution. Visalakshi loses all her wealth in the process. In a twist of fate, Padmanabham is shocked to know through Hemalatha that Mohan Rao is the son of his rival Purushotham. How Padmanabham deals with the situation, and how he becomes aware of Mohan Rao's criminal deeds, and Pasupathi's ulterior motive forms the rest of the plot.

Cast 
V. Nagayya
Y. V. Rao
Pushpavalli
Gohar Mamajiwala
Lalitha
Bezawada Rajarathnam
T. Suryanarayana
Doraiswamy
Cocanada Rajarathnam
P. Ganga Rathnam
Rangaswamy
Sampurna

Soundtrack 
The lyrics for the soundtrack were written by Balijepalli Lakshmikantha Kavi, the songs were choreographed by Srinivasa Kulakarni.

"Melavimpagade Cheliya Veena"
"Bhale Face Beautiful Nee Pose"
"Yee Poo Podarinta"

Release and reception 
The film had an unprecedented release in 1940 at 11 centers in Madras Presidency, and turned out to be a mediocre success.

References 

1940 films
1940s romantic thriller films
1940s Telugu-language films
Films about actors
Films about entertainers
Films about mass media people
Films about mass media owners
Films scored by Ogirala Ramachandra Rao
Films about modeling
Films about filmmaking
Indian black-and-white films
Films about film directors and producers
Films about journalists
Indian romantic thriller films
Films about screenwriters
Indian films based on actual events
Films directed by Y. V. Rao